The 2013–14 Austrian Hockey League was a season of the Austrian Hockey League. HC Bolzano defeated EC Red Bull Salzburg in the Championship. As HC Bolzano was from Italy, Red Bull Salzburg was recognized as Austrian champions, while Bolzano was recognized as the overall EBEL winners.

First round

Second round

Final round

Qualification round

Playoffs

External links 

Erste Bank Eishockey Liga Spieler Statistik

References 

Austrian Hockey League seasons
Aus
1
Aus
2013–14 in Italian ice hockey
2013–14 in Czech ice hockey
2013–14 in Hungarian ice hockey